Ribes lehmannii is a species of plant in the family Grossulariaceae. It is endemic to Ecuador.  Its natural habitats are subtropical or tropical moist montane forest, subtropical or tropical high-altitude shrubland, and subtropical or tropical high-altitude grassland.

References

lehmannii
Endemic flora of Ecuador
Vulnerable plants
Taxonomy articles created by Polbot